Lee Jang-hyeong (born 16 August 1974) is a South Korean gymnast. He competed at the 2000 Summer Olympics where he finished fourth in the pommel horse final.

References

External links
 

1974 births
Living people
South Korean male artistic gymnasts
Olympic gymnasts of South Korea
Gymnasts at the 2000 Summer Olympics
Sportspeople from Daegu
Asian Games medalists in gymnastics
Gymnasts at the 1994 Asian Games
Gymnasts at the 1998 Asian Games
Asian Games gold medalists for South Korea
Asian Games silver medalists for South Korea
Medalists at the 1994 Asian Games
Medalists at the 1998 Asian Games
20th-century South Korean people